{{DISPLAYTITLE:C41H28O27}}
The molecular formula C41H28O27 (molar mass: 952.61 g/mol, exact mass: 952.0818 u) may refer to:

 Geraniin, an ellagitannin
 Granatin B